may refer to:
Ōshima Subprefecture (Tokyo) of Tokyo
Ōshima Subprefecture (Kagoshima) of Kagoshima Prefecture

See also
Oshima Subprefecture of Hokkaidō